The 2004 European Parliament election in Lithuania was the election of MEP representing Lithuania constituency for the 2004–2009 term of the European Parliament. It was part of the wider 2004 European election. The vote took place on 13 June 2004.

Results
The Labour Party received the most votes (30.16 per cent) and won in 55 municipalities. The Social Democratic Party of Lithuania received 14.43 per cent of the votes and won in 1 municipality. The Homeland Union received 12.58 per cent of the votes and won in 1 municipality.

Lithuania
European Parliament elections in Lithuania
European